The Mayor of the City of Jerusalem is head of the executive branch of the political system in Jerusalem. The mayor's office administers all city services, public property, most public agencies, and enforces all city and state laws within Jerusalem.

The mayor's office is located in Safra Square; it has jurisdiction over all the city's neighborhoods. The mayor appoints many officials, including  deputy mayors and city departments directors.

History
The Jerusalem City Council was established in 1863 during the rule of the Ottoman Empire. From 1948 to 1967 two municipalities operated in the city: an Israeli municipality provided services to the western neighborhoods of the city and a Jordanian municipality to its eastern parts.

By 1840, the Jewish community constituted the largest single religious group in the city. From the 1880s onward, the Jews constituted the majority within the city. However, it was only in 1937, under the British Mandate, that the first Jewish mayor was appointed. Since 1948 every mayor has been Jewish.

List of Mayors of Jerusalem (1845–present)
This is a list of mayors of Jerusalem in chronological order.

Ottoman Empire (1845–1920)
1845–1847 – Kıbrıslı Mehmed Emin Pasha, whose first wife,  Melek Hanım wrote a book which also described their life in Jerusalem
1848–1863 – Ahmad Agha Duzdar Al-Asali (official title: Governor of Jerusalem)
1863–1867 – Abdelrahman al-Dajani
1867 – Rafadulo Astiriyadis Effendi (acting)
1867–1869 – Abdelrahman al-Dajani
1869 – Mūsā Faydī al-'Alamī
1869–1870 – Abd al-Salām Paşa al Ḥusaynī
1870–1876 – Yousef Al-Khalidi
Triumvirate 1876–1877 – Abd al-Qādir al-Khalīlī Abū l-Hudā/'Umar 'Abd al-Salām Paşa al Ḥusaynī/Salīm Shākir al-Ḥusaynī.
1877 – Shaḥāda Faydallāh al-'Alamī
1877–1878 – Rafadulo Astiriyadis Effendi (acting)
1878–1879 – Yousef Al-Khalidi
1879–1881 – Mūsā Faydī al-'Alamī
1882–1897 – Ḥusayn Salīm Paşa al Ḥusaynī
1897–1899 – Yaseen al-Khalidi 
1899–1906 – Yousef Al-Khalidi
1906–1909 – Faidi al-Alami
1909–1917 – Hussein al-Husayni 
1917–1918 – Aref al-Dajani
1918–1920 – Musa Kazim al-Husayni

Mandatory Palestine (1920–1948)

Divided Jerusalem (1948–1967)

Reunited Jerusalem (1967–present)

See also
 Mayoral elections in Jerusalem
 History of Jerusalem
 List of people from Jerusalem
 Timeline of Jerusalem

References

External links
 Mayors of Jerusalem
 Jerusalem at World Statesmen
 Mayors of Jerusalem at City of Jerusalem

 
Mayors